The 20889 / 20890 Howrah–Tirupati Humsafar Express is a completely 3-tier AC sleeper trains of the Indian Railways connecting  in West Bengal and  in Andhra Pradesh. It is currently being operated with 20889/20890 train numbers on a weekly basis.

From 23 February 2019 the train was extended from Vijayawada Junction to Tirupati and from 24 February 2019 in the reverse direction.

Service

It averages 65 km/hr as 20889/Howrah–Tirupati Humsafar Express starts on Saturday and covering 1617  km in 26 hrs 5 mins & 63 km/hr as 20890/Tirupati–Howrah Humsafar Express starts on Sunday covering 1618  km in 26 hrs 25 mins.

Schedule

Route & halts

WEST BENGAL
 
 

ODISHA
 
 

ANDHRA PRADESH

Coaches 

The trains is completely 3-tier AC LHB coach designed by Indian Railways with features of LED screen display to show information about stations, train speed etc. and will have announcement system as well, Vending machines for tea, coffee and milk, Bio toilets in compartments as well as CCTV cameras.

Composition 
This train consists of sixteen AC III Tier coaches, one Pantry car and two Generator Power Car coaches.

 16 AC III Tier
 1 Pantry car
 2 Generator Power Car

Loco link 

And then from Visakhapatnam to Tirupati it is hauled by WAP-7 of Lallaguda shed.

Rake sharing

The train has rake sharing with 22887/22888 Howrah–Yesvantpur Humsafar Express.

Direction reversal

The train reverses its direction 1 times:

 Visakhapatnam railway station

See also 

 Humsafar Express
 Jammu Tawi railway station
 Tirupati railway station
 Howrah–Yesvantpur Humsafar Express

Notes

References

References 
20889/Howrah - Vijayawada Humsafar Express India Rail Info
20890/Vijayawada - Howrah Humsafar Express India Rail Info

Humsafar Express trains
Rail transport in Andhra Pradesh
Rail transport in West Bengal
Rail transport in Odisha
Trains from Howrah Junction railway station
Rail transport in Howrah
Transport in Vijayawada
Railway services introduced in 2017